Aviation Maintenance Administrationman (AZ) is a United States Navy occupational rating.

Duties
An Aviation Maintenance Administrationman performs technical, managerial, and support duties required by the Naval Aviation Maintenance Program (NAMP). These can include: 
 Preparing aircraft and maintenance-related correspondence
 Maintaining directive control
 Maintaining custody records, control forms, and reporting requirements
 Maintaining files on departmental organization, manning, personnel temporary additional duty (TAD), transfers, and training requirements
 Planning, programming, and coordinating scheduled/unscheduled maintenance tasks 
 Incorporating changes and modifications to aircraft, aeronautical equipment, and support equipment
 Coordinating squadron/activity maintenance, reporting requirements, and recommending changes to maintain policies and procedures
 Organizing, maintaining, and operating the Navy Aeronautical Technical Publications Library (TPL) 
 Overseeing dispersed libraries, auditing, and training dispersed librarians
 Operating the Naval Aviation Logistics Command Management Information System (NALCOMIS)
 Inputting, verifying, and validating data related to naval aircraft, including history, operation, maintenance, and equipment.
 Maintaining operations department flight data, historical files, and aviator data.
 Providing support/assistance to organizational, intermediate, and depot maintenance staff areas
 Performing other ad hoc duties concerning organizational, intermediate, and depot maintenance activities or aviation staff commands.

See also
List of United States Navy ratings

References

External links

 United States Navy ratings